Half Alive may refer to:

 Half Alive (album), a 1981 compilation album by Suicide
 Half-Alive, a 1998 live album by Helix
 Half Alive (band), an American band from Long Beach, California